Princess Charlotte of Saxe-Meiningen (11 September 1751, Frankfurt am Main, Free Imperial City of Frankfurt, Holy Roman Empire – 25 April 1827, Genoa, Kingdom of Sardinia) was a member of the House of Saxe-Meiningen and a Princess of Saxe-Meiningen by birth and a member of the House of Saxe-Gotha-Altenburg and Duchess consort of Saxe-Gotha-Altenburg through her marriage to Ernest II, Duke of Saxe-Gotha-Altenburg.

Early life and family
Princess Charlotte was born on 
11 September 1751. She was the eldest child and daughter of Anton Ulrich, Duke of Saxe-Meiningen and his second wife, Landgravine Charlotte Amalie of Hesse-Philippsthal. Charlotte was an elder sister of Charles William, Duke of Saxe-Meiningen and George I, Duke of Saxe-Meiningen.

Marriage
Charlotte married Ernest, Hereditary Prince of Saxe-Gotha-Altenburg (later Duke of Saxe-Gotha-Altenburg), son of Frederick III, Duke of Saxe-Gotha-Altenburg and his wife Luise Dorothea of Saxe-Meiningen, on 21 March 1769 in Meiningen. Charlotte and Ernest had four children:

 Ernest, Hereditary Prince of Saxe-Gotha-Altenburg (b. Gotha, 27 February 1770 – d. Gotha, 3 December 1779).
 Augustus, Duke of Saxe-Gotha-Altenburg (b. Gotha, 23 November 1772 – d. Gotha, 27 May 1822)
 Frederick IV, Duke of Saxe-Gotha-Altenburg (b. Gotha, 28 November 1774 – d. Gotha, 11 February 1825).
 Prince Ludwig of Saxe-Gotha-Altenburg (b. Gotha, 21 October 1777 – d. Gotha, 26 October 1777).

Charlotte's husband, Ernest, was regarded as an enlightened monarch and a great patron of art and science, who led his country into a cultural flowering. He was assisted in his cultural undertakings by his wife, Charlotte.

Like her husband, Charlotte was a patron of astronomy. She counted relief panels for the court astronomer Franz Xaver von Zach and she also participated in observations. Charlotte also participated in the First European Astronomy Congress in 1798 at the Seeberg Observatory and independently corresponded with the leading astronomers of her time.

Later life
After her husband's death in 1804, there were difficulties with Charlotte's son, Augustus, upon his succession. Charlotte left Gotha with Zach and spent some time in Eisenberg. Later she traveled with Zach throughout southern Europe and lived several years in Marseilles, and later in Genoa, where she died in 1827.

Ancestry

References 

 Bärbel Raschke: Charlotte Amalie Herzogin von Sachsen-Meiningen (1730–1801). Leben und Wirken im Kontext westeuropäischer und deutscher Aufklärung. In: Francia 2. Bd. 25, 1999, S. 69-103.
 Ingeborg Titz-Matuszak und Peter Brosche (Hrsg.): Das Reisetagebuch 1807 der Herzogin Charlotte Amalie von Sachsen-Gotha-Altenburg. Thüringisches Staatsarchiv Gotha, Gotha 2003 (=Reihe: Schriften des Thüringischen Staatsarchivs Gotha. Bd.1. ).

External links
 
 Katalog der Theaterbibliothek Herzogin Charlottes von Sachsen-Gotha-Altenburg

1751 births
1827 deaths
House of Saxe-Meiningen
House of Saxe-Gotha-Altenburg
People from Frankfurt
18th-century German astronomers
Women astronomers
Amateur astronomers
Princesses of Saxe-Meiningen
Princesses of Saxe-Gotha-Altenburg
Duchesses of Saxe-Gotha-Altenburg
18th-century women scientists
Daughters of monarchs